A close-ratio transmission describes a motor vehicle transmission with a smaller than average difference between the gear ratios. They are most often used on sports cars in order to keep the engine in the power band. There is no industry standard as to what constitutes a close-ratio transmission, a transmission that one manufacturer terms close-ratio may not necessarily be considered close-ratioed by another manufacturer. Generally speaking, the more gears a transmission has, the closer they are together. A continuously variable transmission has a near infinite "number" of gear ratios, which implies an infinitely close-ratio between gears. However, with no specific gear ratios, it would not be considered a close-ratioed transmission.

Comparison with ordinary transmission
This table compares the ratios of three Porsche 911 vehicles from 1967 to 1971, the first being the standard 901/75 transmission, the second being the 901/76 transmission denoted "For hill climbs", and the third being the 901/79 transmission denoted "Nurburgring ratios".

Mathematically, this closeness can be represented by the cumulative average spacing between, or geometric average of, gears. For the above series transmission, each successive gear's ratio is on average 75% of that of the preceding gear (e.g. (0.82 / 2.64)1/4 = 0.747). The Hill Climb transmission has successive gear ratios 81% of that of the preceding gear, and the Nuerburgring transmission has successive gear ratios 77% of that of the preceding gear. Thus, the Hill Climb transmission's gears are "closer" in numerical ratio to the preceding gear than that of the standard or Nuerburgring transmission, making it a close-ratio transmission.

There is no specific figure that is used to denote whether the steps between gears constitute a normal or close-ratio transmission. Often, manufacturers use this term when offering a standard manual transmission and an optional, sportier transmission, one with closer ratios than the other, such as Porsche above did. But this close ratio transmission is not necessarily closer in ratios than another manufacturer's normal manual transmission.

Application
To maximize acceleration, the engine speed of an automobile must be kept near the engine speeds where maximum power is developed. For this reason, vehicles utilize transmissions; as the vehicle's speed increases to the point that the engine speed exceeds the speed at which maximum power is developed, the driver shifts to a higher gear (numerically lower ratio), which reduces engine speed and allows continued acceleration.

Internal combustion engines found in passenger automobiles are able to operate over a relatively wide range of speeds. A close-ratio type of transmission is designed to allow an engine to remain in a relatively narrow operating speed. Alternatively, a wide-ratio transmission requires the engine to operate over a greater speed range, but requires less shifting and allows a wider range of output speeds.  Close-ratio transmissions are generally offered in sports cars, in which the engine is tuned for maximum power in a narrow range of operating speeds and the driver can be expected to enjoy shifting often to keep the engine in its power band.

It is possible for the next higher gear to be such that upshifting lowers the engine speed excessively, resulting in the engine being operated outside its "power band". For example, the 1967 Porsche 911 S produced 160 hp at 6600/min and 179 Nm of torque at 5200/min. Using the Standard transmission gear ratios above, assuming the driver shifts from 2nd to 3rd gear at 6,600/min, the engine speed would fall to 4,990/min (which is 6600 x 1.27 / 1.78). In this case, shifting up to 3rd gear causes the engine speed to be slightly below the speed at which maximum power is produced. By using a close-ratio gearbox, such as the Hill Climb example above, shifting to 3rd gear would drop engine speed to 5,110/min (6600 x 1.55 / 2.00), which almost coincides with the maximum power output of the engine.

Likewise, the Nuerburgring gearset above is also slightly numerically closer than the Standard gearset, making it more useful for sporting applications. However, the Nuerburgring specification has a "taller" (numerically lower) 5th gear ratio than the Hill Climb gearbox, allowing for higher top speeds necessary for this faster racing circuit.

The Standard gearset with its numerically lower 5th gear, will allow even lower engine speeds at highway speeds, thereby reducing engine noise and fuel consumption, but compromises acceleration performance at very high speeds.

Pseudo close-ratio transmissions
One way to create a close-ratio transmission is to install more gears into the transmission without altering the lowest and highest gear ratios. In this manner, some six-speed transmissions available in consumer vehicles are labelled as "close-ratio". Again, the defining issue is the overall spacing of gears between 1st and in this case 6th gear.

Whether a six-speed transmission can be legitimately called "close-ratio" depends on whether it keeps the top gear unchanged relative to that of a comparable 5-speed model, thus causing the change in ratios from low to high gear to occur in smaller steps (i.e. closer ratios) between gears. Alternatively, some six-speed transmissions have ratios essentially the same as a 5-speed transmission, and add an even higher (numerically lower) 6th gear that allows even lower engine speeds at highway speeds. In this case, the transmission would be considered a "double" overdrive transmission, depending upon the 5th and 6th gear ratios.

By extension, an automatic transmission could also be called close-ratioed. With the advent of 6-, 7-, and 8-speed automatic transmissions, the ratios become closer and closer together, which meets the mathematical conception of what constitutes a close-ratio transmission.

Continuously Variable Transmissions (CVT) 
Prior to the 1970s, manufacturers' manual transmissions generally had three or four gears. To meet requirements to maximize fuel economy, manufacturers began offering 5- and, in the 1990s, 6- speed manual transmissions. Likewise, 3-speed automatic transmissions were the norm until fairly recently, but now 6-, 7-, and 8-speed automatic transmissions are being offered.

By reducing the spacing between ratios allowed by having more gears, a vehicle's engine speed can be kept in a narrow band. With a 5-speed transmission, the power range must be relatively wide, which requires compromising the engine's efficiency. With an 8-speed transmission, the power range can be kept relatively narrow, which allows the engineer to optimize engine efficiency at a particular engine speed, and the transmission attempts to keep the engine operating at that speed.

(Engine efficiency improves greatly when the load on the engine is maximized; hence, automatic transmissions also upshift whenever possible in an attempt to lower the engine's speed as much as possible, which increases load and efficiency.)

The recent introduction of continuously variable transmissions (CVTs) attempts to push this strategy to its logical conclusion. This allows a near infinite "number" of gear ratios, which this implies an infinitely close-ratioed transmission. However, given that there are no gears or specific gear ratios, one would not really consider such a transmission close-ratioed.

References

Automotive transmission technologies
Motorcycle transmissions
Engineering ratios